SDA or sda may refer to:

Educational institutions
 San Dieguito Academy, Encinitas, California, US
 SDA Bocconi School of Management, in Milan, Italy

Science and technology

Biology
 Specific dynamic action, the thermic effect of food
 Structured digital abstract, describing relationships between biological entities
 Sabouraud dextrose agar , microbiological media allows fungus to grow

Chemistry
 Stearidonic acid, omega-3 fatty acid

Medicine
 Serotonin–dopamine antagonist, atypical antipsychotic

Physics
 Space domain awareness, the ability to detect, track, and characterize passive and active space objects

Technology
 /dev/sda, the first mass-storage disk in Unix-like operating systems
 Screen Design Aid, a utility program used by midrange IBM computer systems
 Scratch drive actuator, converts electrical energy into motion
 Serial Data Signal of an I²C electronic bus
 Stereo Dimensional Array, Polk Audio technology
 T-Mobile SDA, a smartphone

Organizations

Political
 Singapore Democratic Alliance, an alliance of political parties in Singapore
 Social Democratic Alliance (UK), a former political group in the UK
 Stranka Demokratske Akcije, "Party of Democratic Action" in Bosnia and Herzegovina
 Social Democratic Alliance in Vietnam

Others
 SD Card Association, responsible for Secure Digital memory card standards
 Seventh-day Adventist Church, a Protestant Christian denomination
 Shop, Distributive and Allied Employees Association, Australia

Other uses
Former Saddam International Airport, airport code
Same-day affirmation of financial market deals
San Diego and Arizona Railway, reporting mark
SDA Tennis Open, a tournament held in Bercuit, Belgium
Security & Defence Agenda, a Brussels-based think-tank
Severe Disablement Allowance, a UK state benefit
Southern Domestic Airspace, Canada
Space Development Agency, a DoD RDT&E agency
Specially denatured alcohol
Speed Demos Archive of video game speedruns
Swiss Telegraphic Agency (Schweizerische Depeschenagentur)
Symbolic data analysis